Minnesota Point, also known as the Park Point neighborhood of Duluth, Minnesota, United States; is a long, narrow sand spit that extends out from the Canal Park tourist recreation-oriented district of the city of Duluth. The Point separates Lake Superior from Superior Bay and the Duluth Harbor Basin.

Lake Avenue South / Minnesota Avenue serves as a main route in the community.

Near the end of Minnesota Point is a small airport, Sky Harbor Airport. Beyond the airport, approximately 3/4 mile, is an old growth red and white pine forest. Within the forest is a Minnesota Department of Natural Resources designated area, the Minnesota Point Pine Forest Scientific and Natural Area, which encompasses 18 acres.

Minnesota Point is approximately 7 miles in length, and when included with adjacent Wisconsin Point, which extends 3 miles out from the city of Superior, Wisconsin, totals 10 miles.

History

Due to the short and easy portage across Minnesota Point, the Ojibwa name for the city of Duluth is Onigamiinsing ("at the little portage").

In the 1850s, the Saint Louis River was established as the border between neighboring states Minnesota and Wisconsin and the two ports Duluth (Minnesota) and Superior (Wisconsin) became fierce economic competitors for shipping traffic off of Lake Superior. As commercial traffic on Lake Superior increased with the completion of the Sault Ste Marie canal connecting Lake Superior to Lake Michigan, Congress appropriated the funds to build a lighthouse on the narrow opening in Minnesota Point, known as Superior Entry. The Minnesota Point Light, built between 1855 and 1858, was the first to use RH Barret's Fifth Order Fresnel lamp and Barret became the station's first lighthouse keeper, succeeded in 1861 by Samuel Stewart Palmer. This lighthouse was affectionately known by the name "The Old Standby." It is now an abandoned ruin listed on the National Register of Historic Places.

Since the digging of the Duluth Ship Canal in 1870–1871, Minnesota Point is technically an island, connected to the rest of the city of Duluth since 1905 by the Aerial Lift Bridge.

Adjacent neighborhoods
Canal Park and Downtown Duluth – to the immediate north

See also
 Minnesota Point Light
 Wisconsin Point Light
 Wisconsin Point

Notes

External links
City of Duluth website
City map of neighborhoods (PDF)
History of the Minnesota Point Lighthouse

Duluth–Superior metropolitan area
Neighborhoods in Duluth, Minnesota
Peninsulas of Minnesota
Geography of Duluth, Minnesota
Spits of the United States
Minnesota populated places on Lake Superior
Duluth, Minnesota